Kupri may refer to:

 Kupri Amazai, village in Pakistan
 Kupri, Budaun, village and gram panchayat in Jagat block, Budaun district, Uttar Pradesh, India
 Altun Kupri, town north of Kirkuk in Kirkuk Governorate in Iraq
 The Primate Research Institute of Kyoto University, whose work with Project Ai has made progress in understanding chimpanzee communication.